Ofspor is a Turkish football club founded in 1968 and currently playing in the TFF Third League. Their club colours are claret and blue. They play home matches at the Of ilçe Stadı in the coastal town of Of in Trabzon Province.

Players

Current squad

External links
Official website
Ofspor on TFF.org

 
Sport in Trabzon
Football clubs in Turkey
1968 establishments in Turkey